Hoshihananomia hononomi is a species of beetle in the genus Hoshihananomia of the family Mordellidae, which is part of the superfamily Tenebrionoidea. The date of discovery is unknown.

References

Mordellidae
Beetles described in 1935
Taxa named by Hiromichi Kono